The 1905 Saint Louis Blue and White football team was an American football team that represented Saint Louis University during the 1905 college football season. In their first and only season under head coach Tommy Dowd, the team compiled a 7–2 record and outscored opponents by a total of 267 to 43.

Schedule

References

Saint Louis
Saint Louis Billikens football seasons
Saint Louis Blue and White football